Pajamas is a 1927 American comedy film directed by John G. Blystone and written by William Conselman and Malcolm Stuart Boylan. The film stars Olive Borden, Lawrence Gray, J.J. Clark and Jerry Miley. The film was released on October 23, 1927, by Fox Film Corporation.

Cast       
Olive Borden as Angela Wade
Lawrence Gray as John Weston
J.J. Clark as Daniel Wade 
Jerry Miley as Russell Forrest

References

External links
 

1927 films
1920s English-language films
Silent American comedy films
1927 comedy films
Fox Film films
Films directed by John G. Blystone
American silent feature films
American black-and-white films
1920s American films